Ali Mirzai may refer to:

 Ali Mirzai (football), Iranian football player
 Ali Mirzai-ye Olya, village in Iran, in the Khaveh-ye Jonubi Rural District
 Ali Mirzai-ye Sofla, village in Iran, in the Khaveh-ye Jonubi Rural District
 Ali Mirzaei (weightlifter), Iranian weightlifter